Min Kyeong-ho (born 25 July 1996) is a South Korean track and road cyclist, who currently rides for UCI Continental team . At the 2016 Asian Cycling Championships he won the gold medal in the points race, the bronze medal in the individual pursuit and the bronze medal in the team pursuit. In 2017, he also had success on the road, winning the Tour de Korea, a 2.1 event on the UCI Asia Tour. He also competed at the 2019 UCI Track Cycling World Championships.

Major results
2017
 1st  Overall Tour de Korea
1st Stage 2
2019
 2nd Time trial, National Road Championships
 10th Overall Tour de Korea

References

External links

1996 births
Living people
South Korean track cyclists
South Korean male cyclists
Place of birth missing (living people)
Cyclists at the 2018 Asian Games
Asian Games competitors for South Korea